Umberto Bassignani (29 August 1878 – 21 January 1944) was an Italian sculptor. He designed public sculptures in Italy, France, Switzerland, Russia and Monaco, where he had an atelier.

Early life
Umberto Bassignani was born on 29 August 1878 in Fivizzano, Tuscany, Italy.

Career
Bassignani opened an atelier at 13 boulevard Charles III in Monaco in 1907. He designed many sculptures in the Monaco Cemetery. He exhibited his work at the Exposition Universelle et Internationale in Brussels in 1910, where he represented Monaco and he won a silver medal for a bust.

Bassignani designed public sculptures in Italy, France, Switzerland, Russia and Monaco. For example, he designed the World War I monuments in his hometown of Fivizzano as well as in Vazzola. In France, he designed sculptures in Paris, Nice, Aurillac and Peille. His public sculptures can also be seen in Rostov, Russia, and in Geneva, Switzerland. He also designed the fountain on the Place Saint Nicolas in Monaco-Ville in 1930.

Bassignani left Monaco in 1939.

Death and legacy
Bassignani died on 21 January 1944 in Lerici, Liguria, Italy. On 2 May 2017, the mayor of Monaco, Georges Marsan, dedicated a commemorative plaque at the bottom of the fountain on the Place Saint Nicolas, with his name and dates.

Further reading

References

1878 births
1944 deaths
People from the Province of Massa-Carrara
Italian male sculptors
Sculptors from Tuscany
19th-century Italian male artists
19th-century Italian sculptors
20th-century Italian sculptors
20th-century Italian male artists